Lu Diping (1887–1935) was a Chinese military general and politician. Born in Ningxiang, Hunan province, he was a graduate of Hunan Military College and a participant in the Wuchang Uprising. He commanded the 2nd Army and the 18th Division. He was allied with Wang Jingwei and the left wing faction of the KMT. He was chairman of the governments of Hunan from 1928–29, Jiangxi from 1929-31 and Zhejiang from 1931–34, resigning from the latter post as a consequence of the murder of Shi Liangcai. Lu died on January 24, 1935, in Nanjing, China.

External links

 Provinces and Administrative Divisions of China 
 Rulers, Index Lo-Ly

1887 births
1935 deaths
People of the Northern Expedition
National Revolutionary Army generals from Hunan
People from Ningxiang
Republic of China warlords from Hunan
Politicians from Changsha